The Ambassador from New Zealand to the Philippines is New Zealand's foremost diplomatic representative in the Republic of the Philippines, and in charge of New Zealand's diplomatic mission in the Philippines.

The embassy is located in Manila, the Philippines' capital city.  New Zealand has maintained a resident ambassador in the Philippines since 1975.

List of heads of mission

Ministers to the Philippines

Non-resident ministers, resident in Hong Kong
 Bill Challis (1966–1968)
 Gray Thorp (1968–1971)

Ambassadors to the Philippines

Non-resident ambassadors, resident in Hong Kong
 Richard Taylor (1971–1975)

Resident ambassadors
 Mac Chapman (1975–1978)
 Barbara Angus (1978–1981)
 David Holborow (1981–1984)
 Paul Cotton (1984–1988)
 Alison Stokes (1988–1992)
 Harle Freeman-Greene (1992–1995)
 Colin Bell (1995–1998)
 Graeme Waters (1998–2001)
 Terry Baker (2001–2004 )
 Rob Moore-Jones (2004–2006)
 David Pine (2006–2008)
 Andrew Matheson (2008–2012)
 Reuben Levermore (2012–2014)
 David Strachan (2014–2019)
 Peter Kell (2019–present)

References
 New Zealand Heads of Overseas Missions: the Philippines.  New Zealand Ministry of Foreign Affairs and Trade.  Retrieved on 2008-03-29.

Philippines
New Zealand